Borzabad (also Romanized as Borzābād) is a village in Kuh Dasht Rural District, Neyasar District, Kashan County, Isfahan Province, Iran. At the 2006 census, its population was 114, in 32 families.

References 

Populated places in Kashan County